Ask the Family is a British game show that was first broadcast on BBC1 from 12 June 1967 to 22 October 1984 hosted by Robert Robinson and then on UK Gold from 6 June to 10 October 1999 hosted by Alan Titchmarsh and from 4 April to 5 May 2005 hosted by Dick & Dom on BBC Two.

Format

The show took the form of a quiz contest between two teams, with each team consisting of four members of a single family – two parents and two teenage children. Over the course of the thirty-minute show the teams were asked a variety of general knowledge questions and mental puzzles, with the winner advancing to later rounds, culminating in a grand final between the two families that had been unbeaten in the series.

The teams were asked questions, with certain questions directed at only certain members of the family – such as "children only", or "father and elder child only".

Theme music
The 1960s series' theme music, with its distinctive sitar, was "Acka Raga" by John Mayer and Joe Harriott. The second theme tune, from the mid 1970s was "Sun-Ride" by John Leach (from the Chappell Recorded Production Music Library), which featured the cimbalom. The third theme tune was an arrangement of Scott Joplin's "Maple Leaf Rag" for banjo, piano and brass. "Sun-Ride" returned as the theme tune for the 1999 revival series.

Transmissions

In popular culture
The show was parodied in contemporary comedy TV shows during the 1970s and 1980s, notably in Not the Nine O'Clock News in which both families were introduced as being almost identical save for surname, with all being quantity surveyors by profession (including the children). A spoof edition on The Kenny Everett Television Show featured Everett as Robert Robinson and as the (female) heads of the respective Windsor and Thatcher families.  An episode of the radio sketch show I'm Sorry I'll Read That Again opened with a parody where "Robin Robertson", played by John Cleese, poured scorn on the families and abandoned them in disgust. One episode of The Burkiss Way likewise parodied it as Ask the Cleverdicks.

At one point tabloid newspapers made much of an occasion where the father of one family correctly answered the question "What is the sum of all the numbers from 1 to 100?" in a few seconds.  However, there is a quick formula for the answer, as demonstrated by Carl Friedrich Gauss, and the answer may have been known to the person in question.

References

External links

1960s British game shows
1970s British game shows
1980s British game shows
1990s British game shows
2000s British game shows
1967 British television series debuts
2005 British television series endings
BBC television game shows
English-language television shows
British television series revived after cancellation